The men's competition in the heavyweight (– 105 kg) division was held on 11–12 November 2011.

Schedule

Medalists

Records

Results

References

(Pages 50, 54 & 57) Start List 
2011 IWF World Championships Results Book Pages 47–49 
Results

2011 World Weightlifting Championships